Events from the year 1881 in Sweden

Incumbents
 Monarch – Oscar II
 Prime Minister – Arvid Posse

Events

 - Åre railway station opened
 - Malexander Church

Births

26 May – Sten Dehlgren, military officer and newspaper editor (d. 1947).
 8 July – Ruth Gustafson, social democrat, politician, social reformer  (died 1960)
 9 July – Arvid Andersson, tug-of-war competitor (died 1956).
 29 August – Johan Hübner von Holst, sport shooter (died 1945).
 5 October – Florence Stephens, heiress and landowner   (died 1979)
 18 November – Gösta Åsbrink, gymnast (died 1966).

Deaths

 26 march - Lovisa Åhrberg, surgeon and doctor  (born 1801)
 - Sophia Magdalena Gardelius, damask weaver (born 1804)

References

 
Sweden
Years of the 19th century in Sweden